Night unto Night is a 1949 American drama film directed by Don Siegel and written by Kathryn Scola. It is based on the 1944 novel by Philip Wylie. The film stars Ronald Reagan, Viveca Lindfors, Broderick Crawford, Rosemary DeCamp, Osa Massen and Art Baker. The film was released by Warner Bros. on June 10, 1949.

Fifteen years later, Siegel directed Reagan's final film, 1964's The Killers.

Plot
John Galen is in Florida, looking for a new place to live. Galen is a former scientist who now suffers from epilepsy, a fact he keeps hidden from Ann Gracie, a widow who rents him her house. Ann has introduced him to her friends C.L. and Thalia Shawn, a married couple who live nearby. Ann is upset because she believes that she can still hear the voice of her late husband Bill, who was killed in the war. John has an epileptic seizure. Dr. Poole, a psychiatrist, tells him that his condition is worsening. John and C.L., an artist, have discussions of whether there is life after death. Ann's sister Lisa develops a romantic interest in John, but he falls for Ann instead. Depressed over his condition, John breaks a date with Ann and contemplates suicide. He tells Dr. Poole "Death isn't the worst thing in life, only the last." A hurricane threatens as everyone is gathered at the house John rents. John discloses his condition to Ann, who reaffirms her love for him. However, John is reluctant to continue the relationship because of his epilepsy. A drunken Lisa "congratulates" Ann on being the one to watch John deteriorate. Ann slaps Lisa and 
convinces John not to kill himself. The couple reunites.

Cast
 Ronald Reagan as John
 Viveca Lindfors as Ann
 Broderick Crawford as C.L. Shawn
 Rosemary DeCamp as Thalia Shawn
 Osa Massen as Lisa
 Art Baker as Dr. Poole
 Craig Stevens as Tony Maddox
 Erskine Sanford as Dr. Gallen Altheim
 Ann Burr as Willa Shawn
 Johnny McGovern as Willie Shawn
 Lillian Yarbo as Josephine
 Ross Ford as Bellboy
 Almira Sessions as Hotel Maid
 Dick Elliott as Auto Court Manager

Reception
The film was a major box-office flop, earning $449,000 domestically and $249,000 foreign.

References

External links
 
 
 
 

1949 films
1949 drama films
American black-and-white films
Warner Bros. films
Films scored by Franz Waxman
Films directed by Don Siegel
Films about suicide
Films set in Florida
American drama films
Films based on works by Philip Wylie
Films with screenplays by Kathryn Scola
1940s English-language films
1940s American films